Bolsover is a town in Derbyshire, England.

Bolsover may also refer to

Bolsover District, a local government district in Derbyshire, England
Bolsover (UK Parliament constituency)
Bolsover, Ontario, Canada

People
Baron Bolsover, a title in the peerage of the United Kingdom from 1880 to 1977
Antony Bolsover (born 1972), English snooker player
George Henry Bolsover (1910-1990), English academic
Henry Bolsover (1809-1876), English cricketer
Martin Bolsover, British racing driver

See also 
Bolsover Castle
Bolsover House, Saskatchewan, Canada
Bolsover Street, London, England
Beast of Bolsover, a nickname for British former politician Dennis Skinner